The Angkor Youth Orchestra (ANYO) (established in 2006 or 2007) is a Cambodian youth orchestra. Its first performance was at the Angkor Wat temple complex. It is the first establishment for orchestral classical music in Cambodia since the Sangkum Reahniyum Era (1953–1970). The Orchestra is supervised by two musicians: Tep Kuntheareth and Ram Daravong.

Under the coordination of the Cambodian cabinet and with the support of Gunma Junior Orchestra and Shinichi Minami, ANYO has been receiving donations and grown gradually to become a symphony orchestra.

The previous headquarters of ANYO were at the Secondary School of Fine Arts (Cambodia). For current headquarters please check the external link.

ANYO is composed of Cambodian teachers (educated in the former USSR) and young musicians with a total number of around 60 or 70. Most of the musicians come from the Royal University of Fine Arts. Others pay to be taught music and are automatically included in ANYO. Instruments include violins, violas, cellos, double basses and clarinets.

ANYO is still recruiting new musicians and receiving new students.

Performances 
ANYO holds regular annual performances.
 Angkor Wat Stage
 Water Festival: Channel 9's Alain de Londre Concert 2009
 HRH former queen Norodom Monineath Sihanouk's birthday 2010
 Charity Concert: ANYO 2010
 7th International Music Festival, Phnom Penh 2010
 9th International Music Festival, Phnom Penh 2012
 37th Session of The World Heritage Committee's Meeting Opening Ceremony
 10th International Music Festival, Phnom Penh 2013
 INTERNATIONAL FRIENDSHIP ORCHESTRA CONCERT 2014,CELEBRATORY CONCERT OF 10th ANNIVERSARY OF
KING’S CORONATION. On 27 October
 INTERNATIONAL FRIENDSHIP ORCHESTRA CONCERT On 29th Oct 2014 Performance at Thomanoun Temple Siem Reap
 Youth Music Festival in Lao PDR on 2 November 2014
 International Youth Orchestra in Bangkok (Thailand) on 10 May 2015

Repertoire

Original compositions 
 Green City / Green Ville (ទីក្រុងបៃតង)

Covers and rearrangements 
 Natural Barrier (របាំងធម្មជាតិ) : rearrangement of the Korean composition: 라라라 (La La La) by 숙희 (Suki)

See also 
 List of youth orchestras

References

External links 

 

National youth orchestras
2000s establishments in Cambodia
Musical groups established in the 2000s
Cambodian orchestras
Youth organisations based in Cambodia